William Sylvester Allen (August 26, 1857 – December 6, 1926) was an American politician and lawyer.

Born in Hillsboro, Henry County, Iowa, Allen went to the Hillsboro Public Schools. He then graduated from University of Iowa and was admitted to the Iowa bar. Allen practiced law in Birmingham, Van Buren County, Iowa. He served as mayor of Birmingham and on the Birmingham School Board. From 1894 to 1898, Allen served in the Iowa House of Representatives and was a Republican. He then served in the Iowa State Senate from 1909 to 1913. From 1913 to 1919, Allen served as Iowa Secretary of State. He then continued to practice law in Fairfield, Iowa, where he died.

References

Mayors of places in Iowa
School board members in Iowa
Republican Party Iowa state senators
Republican Party members of the Iowa House of Representatives
Secretaries of State of Iowa
1857 births
1926 deaths
People from Henry County, Iowa
People from Fairfield, Iowa
University of Iowa alumni
Iowa lawyers
20th-century American politicians
19th-century American lawyers